is a passenger railway station located in Takatsu-ku, Kawasaki, Kanagawa Prefecture, Japan, operated by the private railway company Tokyu Corporation.

Lines

Station layout
The station consists of four tracks and two elevated opposed side platforms and an elevated station. The two center tracks are used only for through traffic.

Platforms

History

It became a station on the Ōimachi Line from July 1, 1943. In 1966, the station was rebuilt as an elevated station with the opening of the Tokyu Den-en-toshi Line. Between 2007 and 2009, the platforms were rebuilt for the expansion of Ōimachi Line.

Passenger statistics
In fiscal 2019, the station was used by an average of 32,388 passengers daily. 

The passenger figures for previous years are as shown below.

Surrounding area
Teikyo University Mizoguchi Hospital
 Japan National Route 409
Kawasaki City Takatsu Library
Kawasaki City Takatsu Elementary School

See also
 List of railway stations in Japan

References

External links

 

Railway stations in Kanagawa Prefecture
Railway stations in Japan opened in 1927
Railway stations in Kawasaki, Kanagawa